Juliet Anderson (born Judith Carr), also known as Aunt Peg, (July 23, 1938 – January 11, 2010) was an American pornographic actress and adult movie producer, relationship counselor and author. Entering the adult movie business relatively late in life (at age 39), she quickly built a reputation as one of the premier performers in the so-called "Golden Age of Porn", appearing in over seventy films—often as "Aunt Peg", a role portrayed as a giddy, insatiable woman determined to enjoy life and sex to the maximum extent possible. In 1987, she started a new career as a relationship counselor and massage therapist, before returning to adult entertainment in the mid-1990s.

Early life
Judith Carr was born and grew up in Burbank, California, the daughter of a jazz trumpet player and an aspiring nurse. She was afflicted with both childhood arthritis and Crohn's disease and spent a sizable portion of her youth in the hospital or on bedrest.  Graduating from Burbank High School in 1956 (where she was a straight-A student), she briefly attended Long Beach State College as an art major before relocating to Hayama, Japan, in 1961, with her then lover, a Navy sailor. A brief marriage to him did not work out, ending in 1964, and she spent the next thirteen years in various occupations, including clerical worker, teaching assistant in kindergarten and high school, and English as a Second Language teacher, and working as a radio journalist in Finland.

In 1963, while living in Miami, she was secretary to a producer of "nudie" movies and a receptionist at the Burger King home office; she also worked for Avis during this period. In her website autobiography, she indicates that she appeared in an (unnamed) sexploitation film in 1963, portraying a police sergeant.

During this time, she was known by her birth name of Judith Carr. She did not begin using the moniker "Juliet Anderson" until later in her adult film career, when she made the transition from 8mm productions to feature films.  She has also used the stage names of Alice Rigby, Judy Callin, Ruby Sapphire, Judy Carr, Aunt Peg, Judy Fallbrook, and Judith Anderson.

Adult film career
After living in Finland from 1971 to  1977, working as a radio journalist and teaching English to Finnish schoolchildren, she returned to the United States in 1977, and became involved in the pornography business in 1978 while trying to get into documentary film making. She was working in advertising when she answered an ad by hardcore pornography producer Alex de Renzy, who was looking for an actress.  Her career took off after she was cast in the movie Pretty Peaches. She acquired the name of "Aunt Peg" during a clip in the Swedish Erotica series, where she was portrayed as having sex with a niece, who cried out: "Oh, Aunt Peg!"; thus arose the moniker by which  Anderson is best known to her fans.

Anderson appeared in several pornographic magazine pictorials, operated a mail-order business, a casting agency, was a phone operator for a phone-sex service, and made appearances on both radio and television. She also created and performed in stage shows across the United States, combining comedy, sex, and Q&A sessions in her performances.  Anderson later indicated that these stage exhibitions were the "most gratifying" portion of her adult career.

Although Anderson portrayed many characters during her movie career, all tended to be tough-talking and unsentimental, yet rambunctious, vibrant and even comedic—all at the same time. She was said never to have faked an orgasm in any of her films. Author Charles Taylor wrote that she "brought a persona of classic movie-broad to porn", referring to her as "the Joan Blondell of porn." Another critic, Howard Hampton, opined that "her tough, no-nonsense older woman routine would be at home in the margins of any Howard Hawks movie."

Leaving and returning
In 1985, Anderson chose to leave the adult film business after signing over distribution rights for the film Educating Nina, under pressure, a video she directed, produced and funded with money she raised from various donors, which featured the debut of future porn superstar Nina Hartley. She never received any income for the film, and all the investors' money was lost. Juliet moved to Placerville, California, where she worked in a bed and breakfast, cleaned houses and did child care and elder care, continued to do some live stage shows, and opened a massage therapy office. Anderson chose to return to pornography in 1995, making new movies as an actress, producer and director.

In 1998, she directed and produced Ageless Desire, a hardcore video featuring several over-50 real-life couples, including Juliet and her partner at the time.  Numerous awards followed:  Induction into the Erotic Legends Hall of Fame in 1996, an X-rated Critics Organization Hall of Fame Award in 1999, and a "Lifetime Achievement Actress Award" from the Free Speech Coalition in 2001. In 2007, Anderson received an honorary Doctor of the Arts from The Institute for Advanced Study of Human Sexuality. She was featured in the 1998 documentary Wadd: The Life & Times of John C. Holmes and also made one of her last appearances in Dick Ho: Asian Male Porn Star in 2005.

By 2009, Anderson lived in Berkeley, California with four cats, serving as the manager of her apartment complex. Although no longer working in the adult film industry, she had announced plans to produce new films. She also worked as a relationship counselor, giving private workshops for couples focusing on "Tender Loving Touch", in which sexual touching is seen as "the play, not foreplay." She contributed to the books The New Sexual Healers: Women of the Light and The Red Thread of Passion, and authored articles for magazines and newspapers.

Death
On the morning of January 11, 2010, a friend discovered Anderson's body. The friend stated that he had arrived at Anderson's residence to take her to a doctor's appointment for a colonoscopy, to help her with the treatment of Crohn's disease. He further reported that he found Anderson in her bed, with nothing in the room appearing to be "out of the ordinary." He stated that Anderson had expressed a desire to be cremated. A memorial was held on January 26, 2010, at the Center for Sex and Culture in San Francisco where friends she had known in and out of the business, including Nina Hartley whom she mentored, attended and gave testimonials to her kind and warm friendship. Later that month, it was revealed that Anderson had died of a heart attack.

Awards
AVN Awards Hall of Fame
XRCO Hall of Fame (inducted 1999)

References

Literature
Louis Marvin: The New Goddesses (AF Press, USA 1987): Features a chapter on Juliet Anderson.

External links

 
 
 
 "The golden age of porn", "Critics sneer at XXX films. But careers like Juliet Anderson's offer as much to admire as those of John Wayne or Audrey Hepburn.", Charles Taylor, April 13, 2002, Salon.com.
Sex is no Act: A Tribute to Juliet Anderson, by Graham Hill, Cinema Retro, 9 July 2009.  Retrieved on 2009-11-10.

1938 births
2010 deaths
American pornographic film actresses
American women writers
Actresses from Burbank, California
Pornographic film actors from California
People with Crohn's disease
California State University, Long Beach alumni
21st-century American women